"Shawty Wus Up" is a song by American singer Dondria. The song features Johntá Austin and Diamond. It is the second single from her debut album Dondria vs. Phatfffat. The song peaked at number 66 on the Billboard Hot R&B/Hip-Hop Songs chart.

Music video 
The music video for "Shawty Wus Up" was released on July 18, 2010.

Charts

References 

2010 singles
Songs written by Johntá Austin
Songs written by Jermaine Dupri
Song recordings produced by Jermaine Dupri
2010 songs